José Luis Bartolilla (born November 9, 1986, in Córdoba, Argentina) is an Argentinian singer, songwriter and actor. José Luis began his career at age seventeen with the Argentinian pop group El Agite in Córdoba. He moved to Buenos Aires in 2008 and became a musical theater performer. He was one of the top two finalists on El Puma Rodriguez´s team on the first season of The Voice in Argentina.

Discography 
 2013 - José Luis Bartolilla, Uno&Uno en vivo

Tours and shows 
 2013 - Uno&Uno - Buenos Aires and Córdoba, Argentina
 2014 - Canto Versos - Buenos Aires, Argentina
 2014 - Mi Buenos Aires Querido - Ayuntamiento de Córdoba, Andalusia, Spain

Television 
 2004 - Telemanías - Teleocho - Córdoba, Argentina
 2005 - Telemanías - Teleocho - Córdoba, Argentina
 2012 - The Voice Argentina - Telefé - Argentina

Theatre 
 2008 - Contacto Flamenco - Real Theatre, Córdoba and summer season Carlos Paz, Argentina
 2009 - Otelo / Cibrián-Mahler, El Nacional Theatre and National Tour - Argentina
 2010 - El Ratón Perez / Cibrián-Mahler, Astral Theatre - Buenos Aires, Argentina
 2010 - One Thousand and One Nights / Cibrián-Mahler, El Nacional Theatre - Buenos Aires, Argentina
 2010 - Juicio a lo Natural / Nicolás Perez Costa, El Cubo Theatre - Buenos Aires, Argentina
 2010 - Wojtyla / Kotliar-Garabal-Mahler - Ecuador Tour
 2011 - Un Cuento Enredoso - Salta and Jujuy, Argentina
 2011 - El Rey y el Mago - Salta and Jujuy, Argentina
 2011 - Casualidad, el musical / Carla Liguori, Viejo Mercado Theatre - Buenos Aires, Argentina
 2011 - Caos en Zugarramurdi / Nicolas Bertolotto, TTM Theatre - Buenos Aires, Argentina
 2011 - Les Misérables in Concert - La Comedia Theatre - Buenos Aires, Argentina
 2012 - El Príncipe Feliz - Auditorio Losada - Buenos Aires, Argentina
 2012 - Next to Normal / Brian Yorkey-Tom Kitt - Liceo Theatre and Apolo Theatre - Buenos Aires, Argentina
 2013 - Man's Search for Meaning - Buenos Aires, Argentina
 2013 - Hombres de la Independencia - Buenos Aires, Argentina
 2013 - The Three Musketeers - Ciudad de las Artes Theatre - Córdoba, Argentina
 2013 - Un Cuento en Concierto / El Cubo Theatre - Buenos Aires, Argentina
 2014 - Pasos de Amor / El Nacional Theatre - Buenos Aires, Argentina
 2014 - The Three Musketeers - Real Theatre - Córdoba, Argentina
 2015 - The Three Musketeers - La Comedia Theatre - Buenos Aires, Argentina
 2015 - Mi Banda Sonora - Ciudad de las Artes Theatre - Córdoba, Argentina
 2016 - Te quiero hasta la Luna - Córdoba, Argentina
 2016 - Mi Banda Sonora - Ciudad de las Artes Theatre - Córdoba, Argentina
 2017 - Mi Banda Sonora - Ciudad de las Artes Theatre - Córdoba, Argentina
 2018 - Razones para Dejarme - Córdoba, Argentina

Records and achievements 
 2013 - Honorary Citizen of Jesús María, Córdoba, Argentina - Pio León 2013 award to honor his contributions to the arts.
 2014 - One of Billboard´s 14 Artists to Watch in 2014 in Argentina

References

External links

 Official Website.
 José Luis on Facebook
 José Luis on Twitter

1986 births
Living people